"Freak On" is a song performed by the Swedish DJ StoneBridge (Sten Hallström) and the American recording artist Ultra Naté. Co-written by Gerry DeVeaux, Sten Hallström and Ultra Naté, the song was the fourth single released from StoneBridge's album Can't Get Enough and the first single from Ultra Naté's fifth studio album Grime, Silk, & Thunder.

Track listing
UK CD maxi-single
 "Freak On" (album edit) – 3:41	
 "Freak On" (Ferry Corsten Vocal Mix) – 6:44	
 "Freak On" (StoneBridge Club Mix) – 8:08	
 "Freak On" (Live Element Remix) – 7:02	
 "Freak On" (JJ Stockholm Club Mix) – 8:37

Charts

References

2005 singles
StoneBridge (DJ) songs
Ultra Naté songs
2005 songs
Songs written by Gerry DeVeaux